Dyke River is a perennial stream of the Macleay River catchment, located in the Northern Tablelands district of New South Wales, Australia.

Course and features
Dyke River rises on the southern slopes of the Cunnawarra Range on the Dorrigo Plateau in high country east of Uralla and west of Nambucca Heads, and flows generally south by west before reaching its confluence with the Macleay River at Lower Creek, west of Comara. The river descends  over its  course.

See also

 List of rivers of Australia

References

External links
 

Rivers of New South Wales
Northern Tablelands
Armidale Regional Council